In 2012, Kent County Cricket Club competed in Division Two of the County Championship, Group C of the 40-over Clydesdale Bank 40 and the South Group of the Friends Life t20. Kent also hosted a first-class match at the St Lawrence Ground against the touring South Africans. At the start of the season, Kent played a three-day MCC Universities match at Oxford MCCU, but this match did not have first-class status. It was the first season in charge for new head coach Jimmy Adams after the departure of Paul Farbrace who had been the club's Director of Cricket for two seasons. The club captain was former England batsman Rob Key who had been club captain since 2006. Brendan Nash joined Kent as their overseas player.

Kent finished third of nine in Division Two of the County Championship, narrowly missing out on promotion to Division One. The county performed well in the Clydesdale Bank 40, winning 7 out of 9 completed matches, but missed out on qualification for the knockout stages despite finishing level on points with group runners-up Warwickshire. A surprise loss to the Unicorns and a no result against the same opposition when rain forced an abandonment after Kent had restricted their opponents to just 177/8 ultimately proved costly, and Kent missed out on a semi-final appearance after losing their final match against Sussex. The Friends Life t20 campaign was disappointing for Kent, with the side winning just 4 out of 10 matches and finishing in 4th place (out of 6) in the South Group.

At international level, James Tredwell played One Day Internationals for England during the English summer, playing in a single match against Australia and later three matches against South Africa. Tredwell also played two First Class matches for the England Lions against Australia A. Matt Coles also played in one of these matches for the England Lions.

Squad
Kent signed five players ahead of the 2012 season. Fast bowler Charlie Shreck joined from Nottinghamshire in September 2011. Veteran batsman Mike Powell signed for the county after spending 15 seasons with Glamorgan in November. Durham all-rounder Ben Harmison was the third new signing before the end of 2011 when he joined Kent in December. Kent signed Australian-born West Indian batsman Brendan Nash as their overseas player for 2012 in March. The other addition to the squad saw batsman Scott Newman join on loan for the first two months of the season from Middlesex as cover for Daniel Bell-Drummond who was on England Under-19 duty. Newman had dropped down the pecking order at Middlesex after the arrival of Joe Denly from Kent after the end of the 2011 season. Denly had made his debut for Kent in 2004. In addition to Denly, Martin van Jaarsveld had also left the county after the 2011 season. He had been with Kent since 2005 and initially agreed to join Leicestershire, but later cancelled the deal and instead announced his retirement from county cricket in November 2011, citing fatigue. Simon Cook, who had also joined the county in 2005, retired from playing towards the end of the 2012 season.

Squad list
 Ages given as of the first day of the County Championship season, 5 April 2012.

County Championship

Division Two

Matches

Other first-class match

Tour match

Clydesdale Bank 40

Group C

Matches

Friends Life t20

South Division

Matches

MCCU match
Kent's 3-day match against Oxford MCCU in May did not have first-class status.

Statistics

Batting

Bowling

References

External links
Kent home at ESPN cricinfo
Kent County Cricket Club official site

2012
2012 in English cricket